Fisherman's Haven Provincial Park is a provincial park in Prince Edward Island, Canada.

References

Provincial parks of Prince Edward Island
Parks in Prince County, Prince Edward Island